Aurgazinsky District (Awırğazı rayonı; , Awırğazı rayonı; , Avărkas rayonĕ) is an administrative and municipal district (raion), one of the fifty-four in the Republic of Bashkortostan, Russia. It is located in the center of the republic and borders Karmaskalinsky District in the north, Gafuriysky District in the east, Sterlitamaksky District in the south, and with Alsheyevsky and Davlekanovsky Districts in the west. Its administrative center is the rural locality (a selo) of Tolbazy. As of the 2010 Census, the total population of the district was 36,970, with the population of Tolbazy accounting for 27.4% of that number.

Geography
The landscape of the district is characterized by ridges and undulating plains and has deposits of gypsum and limestone and oil fields (such as Buzovyazovskoye, Tolbazinskoye, Urshakskoye, and others). Oak, birch, linden and aspen forests occupy about 18% of the area and a total of 27.3% is wooded. Fauna is represented by steppe and forest species.

History
The district was established on August 20, 1930.

Administrative and municipal status
Within the framework of administrative divisions, Aurgazinsky District is one of the fifty-four in the Republic of Bashkortostan. The district is divided into 21 selsoviets, comprising 137 rural localities. As a municipal division, the district is incorporated as Aurgazinsky Municipal District. Its twenty-one selsoviets are incorporated as twenty-one rural settlements within the municipal district. The selo of Tolbazy serves as the administrative center of both the administrative and municipal district.

References

Notes

Sources

Districts of Bashkortostan
States and territories established in 1930